The Canadian Screen Award for Best Animated Short is awarded by the Academy of Canadian Cinema and Television to the best Canadian animated short film. Formerly part of the Genie Awards, since 2012 it has been presented as part of the Canadian Screen Awards.

Best Theatrical Short Film 
In the 1980s and 1990s, the award was not always presented at every Genie Award ceremony. In years when the award for animated shorts was not presented, a single award was instead presented for Best Theatrical Short Film, inclusive of both animated and live-action shorts.

1960s

1970s

1980s

1990s

2000s

2010s

2020s

Multiple winners (3 or more)
Marcy Page-8
Michael Scott-3
Chris Landreth-3
Marc Betrand-3
Wendy Tilby-3
John Weldon-3

Multiple nominations (3 or more)
Marcy Page-10 (8 wins)
Marcel Jean-10 (1 win)
Marc Betrand-8 (3 wins)
Julie Roy-8 (2 wins)
Michael Fukushima-7 (2 wins)
Wendy Tilby-5 (3 wins)
Theodore Ushev-5 (2 wins)
Michael Scott-4 (3 wins)
John Weldon-4 (3 wins)
Claude Cloutier-4 (1 win)
Christopher Hinton-3 (2 wins)
Cordell Barker-3 (2 wins)
Amanda Forbis-3 (1 win)
Yves Leduc-3 (no wins)
Jelena Popović-3 (no wins)

See also
Prix Iris for Best Animated Short Film
 List of animation awards
National Film Board of Canada
Cinema of Canada

References

 
Animated Short
Canadian animation awards
Awards established in 1968